The Icmadophilaceae are a family of lichenized fungi in the order Pertusariales. The family was circumscribed in 1993, and contains 8 genera and 27 species.

References

Pertusariales
Lichen families
Lecanoromycetes families
Taxa described in 1993